The Mày is a small ethnic group of Vietnam, indigenous of the mountains of Central Vietnamese province of Quảng Bình. In Vietnam, they are considered a sub-ethnic group of the Chứt. Only about 450 individuals of them still speak May language, a distinct Vietic Cheut language.

Track and settlement

The Mày are heavily multilingualism. The endonym Mày and where did it come from are uncertain, according to the May it means "source of river, stream", though Paul Sidwell speculates that it is perhaps a xenonym of Austronesian origin. Early missionaries like Marius	Maunier (1902) and Léopold	Cadière (1905), due to limited contemporary knowledge, simply regarded the Mày as Moï or Rợ "des sauvages" (Vietnamese for "savages"), and they also perhaps were the Kôy that Cadière described.

Prior to the mid-20th century, the Mày had been nomadic hunter-gatherers in the wild Annamite mountains of western Quảng Bình like other Cheut groups. They practiced ancient hunting, foraging, and fishing lifestyle. They used primitive tools (stone dagger, bone knife, crossbow) to hunt and work. Sometimes they used metal tools acquired from agricultural peoples and blacksmiths such as axe. That was all changed in 1958 when the remaining nomadic Cheut tribes were encountered by North Vietnamese soldiers, and the DRV government then resettled the Mày in designated villages forcefully. Today, the Mày live in sedentary settlements within 11 villages in a small junction of Dân Hóa commune, Minh Hóa District. They conventionally grow maize, cassava, rice, and taro on hill paddy fields with crafted metal tools. They breed chickens and pigs. However, due to the recent shift to agriculture, small farming could not sustain the living of Mày families. Many Mày, especially the older generations, persist in hunting, foraging, and fishing.

The Mày dwell in stilt houses, with palm and banana leaf roofs, constructed with help from border guards. The house is often divided: one section for ancestor worship and guest, one for domestic space. Previously, Cheut groups could not weave fabric and clothes. In summer, Mày men wore loincloths and women in skirts. In winter, they wrapped up with tree bark.

May religion and traditions
Mày's main belief is Animism, blended with Laotian Buddhism. May Animism worships many different gods. Their most holy god is Ku Lôông, who in May mythology, is a legendary beastie god that gave birth to an egg, and the egg then hatched into three siblings: the eldest is May, the middleborn is Khua, and the youngest is Nguồn. God Ku Lôông taught the May how to make weapons and bows, and poisoned arrows, helping the May fight off beasts and enemy tribes. They believe in reincarnation and the return of ancestor souls back to the villages. 

Mày animism includes the spirits of nature: the gods of the forest and riverine water. They communicate with the spirits and ghosts via a shaman. The Buddha in Mày folklore is believed to be the ruler of human and creatures' destinies, and he is accompanied by totem animals, usually an amphibian. The Mày have preserved their traditional holidays. One important Mày holiday is Sileng, which takes place in the second half of July and is ritualized with sacrifices in honor of the water serpent Kulong-Tavok. Other holidays are seemed to be influenced by Vietnamese holidays, such as the Lunar New Year Festival.

See also
 Arem people
 Nguồn people

Footnotes

Vietic peoples
Ethnic groups in Vietnam
Quảng Bình province